Edward Miles, Jr. (born July 5, 1940) is a retired American basketball player.

A 6'4" guard born in North Little Rock, Arkansas and a graduate of Scipio A. Jones High School, Miles was nicknamed "The Man with the Golden Arm" because of his shooting prowess.  He averaged 18, 25, 30 and 32 points per game, respectively, in his four years as a varsity high school player, and he led Jones to four state championships.  Miles was recruited by fifty colleges, but he chose to attend Seattle University because of its alumnus Elgin Baylor.  He played three varsity seasons with Seattle and ranked seventh in the nation in scoring during his senior year (1962–63).

Miles was selected by the Detroit Pistons with the fourth pick of the 1963 NBA draft. He played nine NBA seasons with Detroit, the Baltimore Bullets, and the New York Knicks before suffering a career-ending Achilles tendon injury during the 1971–72 NBA season. He was traded from the Pistons to the Bullets for Bob Quick on February 1, 1970 in a transaction that also involved both teams exchanging selections in the subsequent draft with Baltimore receiving a fourth-round pick (54th overall–Bill Stricker) and Detroit a second-rounder (32nd overall–Ken Warzynski). Miles averaged 13.4 points per game in his NBA career and represented the Pistons at the 1966 NBA All-Star Game.

Since retiring as a player, Miles has served as a coach at the college and high school levels.

NBA career statistics

Regular season

Playoffs

References

External links
Where are they now? Eddie Miles
NBA career statistics

1940 births
Living people
All-American college men's basketball players
American men's basketball players
Baltimore Bullets (1963–1973) players
Basketball players from Arkansas
Detroit Pistons draft picks
Detroit Pistons players
National Basketball Association All-Stars
New York Knicks players
People from North Little Rock, Arkansas
Point guards
Seattle Redhawks men's basketball players
Shooting guards